This is a list of cases reported in volume 5 (1 Cranch) of United States Reports, decided by the Supreme Court of the United States from 1801 to 1803.

Nominative reports 
In 1874, the U.S. government created the United States Reports, and retroactively numbered older privately-published case reports as part of the new series.  As a result, cases appearing in volumes 1–90 of U.S. Reports have dual citation forms; one for the volume number of U.S. Reports, and one for the volume number of the reports named for the relevant reporter of decisions (these are called "nominative reports").

William Cranch 
Starting with the 5th volume of U.S. Reports, the Reporter of Decisions of the Supreme Court of the United States was William Cranch. Cranch was Reporter of Decisions from 1801 to 1815, covering volumes 5 through 13 of United States Reports which correspond to volumes 1 through 9 of his Cranch's Reports.  As such, the complete citation to, for example, Talbot v. Seeman is 5 U.S. (1 Cranch) 1 (1801).

Justices of the Supreme Court at the time of 5 U.S. (1 Cranch) 

The Supreme Court is established by Article III, Section 1 of the Constitution of the United States, which says: "The judicial Power of the United States, shall be vested in one supreme Court . . .". The size of the Court is not specified; the Constitution leaves it to Congress to set the number of justices. Under the Judiciary Act of 1789 Congress originally fixed the number of justices at six (one chief justice and five associate justices). Since 1789 Congress has  varied the size of the Court from six to seven, nine, ten, and back to nine justices (always including one chief justice).

John Marshall became Chief Justice in 1801, remaining in that office until his death in 1835; Marshall is the most influential Chief Justice in the Court's history.  When the cases in 5 U.S. (1 Cranch) were decided, the Court comprised these six justices:

Notable cases in 5 U.S. (1 Cranch)

Marbury v. Madison 
Marbury v. Madison, 5 U.S. (1 Cranch) 137 (1803), is a landmark U.S. Supreme Court case that established the principle of judicial review in the United States, meaning that American courts have the power to strike down laws, statutes, and some government actions that they find to violate the Constitution of the United States. Decided in 1803, Marbury remains the single most important decision in American constitutional law. The Court's landmark decision established that the U.S. Constitution is actual law, not just a statement of political principles and ideals, and helped define the boundary between the constitutionally separate executive and judicial branches of the federal government.

Stuart v. Laird 
Stuart v. Laird, 5 U.S. (1 Cranch) 299 (1803), is a case decided by the Supreme Court a week after its famous decision in Marbury v. Madison. Stuart dealt with a judgment of a circuit judge whose position had been abolished by the repeal of the Judiciary Act of 1801. Stuart's lawyer was Charles Lee, who also represented William Marbury. John Laird asked the Supreme Court to uphold the judge's ruling. Stuart's team argued that only the court rendering a judgment could enforce it and that the 1802 of the Judiciary Act had been unconstitutional, to which Stuart lost on both accounts.  The Court reviewed and upheld the constitutionality of the Judiciary Act of 1802 and averted a dangerous showdown between the legislative and the judicial branches of the United States government.

Citation style 

Under the Judiciary Act of 1789 the federal court structure at the time comprised District Courts, which had general trial jurisdiction; Circuit Courts, which had mixed trial and appellate (from the US District Courts) jurisdiction; and the United States Supreme Court, which had appellate jurisdiction over the federal District and Circuit courts—and for certain issues over state courts. The Supreme Court also had limited original jurisdiction (i.e., in which cases could be filed directly with the Supreme Court without first having been heard by a lower federal or state court). There were one or more federal District Courts and/or Circuit Courts in each state, territory, or other geographical region.

Bluebook citation style is used for case names, citations, and jurisdictions.  
 e.g.,"C.C.D.N.J." = United States Circuit Court for the District of New Jersey
 e.g.,"D. Mass." = United States District Court for the District of Massachusetts 
 "E." = Eastern; "M." = Middle; "N." = Northern; "S." = Southern; "W." = Western
 e.g.,"C.C.S.D.N.Y." = United States Circuit Court for the Southern District of New York
 e.g.,"M.D. Ala." = United States District Court for the Middle District of Alabama
 "Ct. Cl." = United States Court of Claims
 The abbreviation of a state's name alone indicates the highest appellate court in that state's judiciary at the time. 
 e.g.,"Pa." = Supreme Court of Pennsylvania
 e.g.,"Me." = Supreme Judicial Court of Maine

List of cases in 5 U.S. (1 Cranch)

Notes and references

See also
 certificate of division

External links
  Case reports in volume 5 (1 Cranch) from Court Listener
  Case reports in volume 5 (1 Cranch) from the Caselaw Access Project of Harvard Law School
  Case reports in volume 5 (1 Cranch) from Justia
  Case reports in volume 5 (1 Cranch) from Open Jurist
 Website of the United States Supreme Court
 United States Courts website about the Supreme Court
 National Archives, Records of the Supreme Court of the United States
 American Bar Association, How Does the Supreme Court Work?
 The Supreme Court Historical Society

1801 in United States case law
1803 in United States case law